Miller Point is a black, rock cape rising to  and forming the north side of the entrance to Casey Inlet, on the east coast of Palmer Land, Antarctica. It was discovered by Sir Hubert Wilkins in a flight on December 20, 1928, and named by him for George E. Miller of Detroit, Michigan. It has since been more fully defined as a result of flights by Lincoln Ellsworth in 1935, and by the flights and sledge journey along this coast from East Base by members of the United States Antarctic Service in 1940.

References

Headlands of Palmer Land